Harakat Hezbollah al-Nujaba (Nujaba or HHN), officially the 12th Brigade is a radical Iraqi Shi'ite paramilitary group that is especially active in Syria and Iraq. It was established in 2013 to support Bashar al- Assad in Syria against anti-regime rebels. The group is handled by the IRGC's Quds Force as part of an Iranian strategy to use sectarian Shi'ite forces in various countries to promote Iran's local and regional interests. It openly receives training, arms, and military advice from Iran. It is part of Iraq's Popular Mobilization Forces (PMF), a group of Shi’ite militias that are close to Iran along with the country's Armed Forces.

HHN has a TV channel named Al-Nujaba TV, which is based in Baghdad, Iraq.

In February 2019, the U.S. Secretary of State Mike Pompeo designated Harakat Hezbollah al-Nujaba (and all its aliases and component parts) and its leader Akram al-Kaabi Specially Designated Global Terrorists (SDGT).

Flags

History 
HHN emerged in 2013 as an offshoot of the Iraqi paramilitary Asaib Ahl al-Haq (AAH) and is led by AAH co-founder Akram al-Kaabi. al-Kaabi said that he formed the militia after a period of militant inactivity in the Syrian Civil War. He denies it emerged from a "split" with AAH, but that he chose not to unify with them due to disagreements. The two groups still share close affinity, often simultaneously commemorating martyrs. They have released a nasheed praising Iranian Quds Force commander Qasem Suleimani. Both groups follow the Iranian government's ideology, and al-Kaabi has stated that he would overthrow the Iraqi government or fight alongside the Yemeni Houthis if ordered by Grand Ayatollah Khamenei.

HHN was one of the first Iraqi paramilitaries to send fighters to Syria, where it has been active since its formation in 2013. It has had an increasing role in Syria after a significant boost to recruitment efforts took place in 2015. It was a major participant in the 2015 South Aleppo offensive and the breaking of the siege of the Shia towns Nubl and Zahraa.

In December 2014, ABNA.ir published photos of Iranian-built Yasir UAV (an unlicensed copy of the American ScanEagle) claimed in use with HHN.

In April 2015, al-Kaabi said HHN had suffered 126 casualties, including 38 in Syria.

On 1 January 2019, al-Kaabi said that the IRGC and Lebanese Hezbollah helped the militant Shi'ite forces of the Mahdi Army that were fighting the U.S. forces in 2004. He said that in the 2004 Battle of Najaf, IRGC and Hezbollah officers were present on the ground and helped during the battle, in which 13 US servicemen were killed and over 100 wounded.

Divisions 
HHN comprises four brigades:
 Liwa Ammar Ibn Yasir (Ammar Ibn Yasir Brigade; designated as terrorist by UAE)
 Liwa al-Hamad (Praise Brigade)
 Liwa al-Imam al-Hassan al-Mujtaba (Brigade of Imam Hassan the Chosen)
 Golan Liberation Brigade

See also 

 List of armed groups in the Syrian Civil War
 List of armed groups in the Iraqi Civil War
 Holy Shrine Defender
Assassination of Qasem Soleimani

References

External links
 

Anti-ISIL factions in Iraq
Anti-ISIL factions in Syria
Paramilitary organizations based in Iraq
Popular Mobilization Forces
Pro-government factions of the Syrian civil war
Rebel groups in Iraq
Resistance movements
Khomeinist groups
Syrian Shia organizations
Organizations designated as terrorist by the United States
Arab militant groups
2013 establishments in Iraq
Military units and formations established in 2013
Organizations based in Asia designated as terrorist
Jihadist groups in Iraq
Jihadist groups in Syria
Anti-Zionism in Iraq
Anti-Western sentiment